Lewis Center (also Lewis Centre) is an unincorporated community in northwestern Orange Township, Delaware County, Ohio, United States, in the Columbus, OH Metropolitan Statistical Area.

Its ZIP code is 43035. Although Lewis Center is a small community, its ZIP code encompasses a number of shopping centers and retail establishments that line U.S. Route 23 in the nearby vicinity. It is located in the Olentangy Local School District.

Lewis Center has a population of 30,398 with an average population density of 1371 people per square mile. The median age in Lewis Center is 33.6, slightly below the United States average of 36.8. The median per capita income in Lewis Center is $49,690 and the median household income is $140,076. Lewis Center is also home of the Olentangy School District, one of Ohio's highest scoring school districts. Due to a higher median income, the area has been in a real estate boom, further amplified by the coronavirus pandemic. Newer development such as Evans Farm have resulted in thousands of new houses being built each year. There are many thriving suburban neighborhoods, like Olentangy Meadows, Oak Creek, Alum Creek, Walker Wood, Glen Oak, North Orange, and the Meadows at Lewis Center. Since 2000, the place has seen itself become a large, growing suburb of Columbus. A highly automated ATS battery assembly plant, which manufactures and tests battery packs and Ultium modules for General Motors electric vehicles, opened in 2022.

History
Lewis Center was founded around 1850 when the railroad was extended to that point. The community was named after the family of William L. Lewis, who gave their land for a railroad station in exchange for the naming rights. A post office called Lewis Centre was established in 1852, and the name was changed to Lewis Center in 1893.

Looking at the ancestry of the community members, 31.1% are of German descent. 14.9% are of Irish descent and 10.7% are of English descent.

Notable people
Kenny Anunike, Member of the Denver Broncos 2016 Super Bowl team
Zac Kerin, Member of the Tennessee Titans NFL team
Frederick S. Nave, Arizona territorial judge
Joshua Perry, former NFL player, current resident
Frank B. Willis, Governor of Ohio from 1915 to 1917

References

Unincorporated communities in Delaware County, Ohio
Unincorporated communities in Ohio